Humaitá is a municipality located in the Brazilian state of Amazonas. Its population was 56,144 (2020) and its area is 33,072 km². The city is located on the banks of the Madeira River.

The city is served by Humaitá Airport. The Trans-Amazonian Highway passes through the city.

The municipality contains part of the strictly-protected Cuniã Ecological Station, an area of cerrado savanna parkland.
It contains 5% of the Campos Amazônicos National Park, a  protected area created in 2006 that protects an unusual enclave of cerrado vegetation in the Amazon rainforest.
It also contains the Humaitá National Forest, a  sustainable use conservation unit created in 1998.

References

 
Municipalities in Amazonas (Brazilian state)